Gabriel Moushe Gawrieh is the head the political branch of the Assyrian Democratic Organization and a Syrian Assyrian leader and political activist.

Life 
Gawrieh was born in Qamishli in 1962 to a Syriac Orthodox family. He studied Agricultural engineering at the University of Aleppo and graduated in 1982.
He joined the Assyrian Democratic Organization where he eventually became one of its leaders in the 2000s.

Role in the Syrian Civil War 
During the initial phase of the Syrian Civil War Gawrieh called for a peaceful democratic transition of power voicing support for non-violent demonstrations.
He was one of the leading secular figures of the Damascus Declaration, he however refused to join the leftist National Coordination Committee for Democratic Change.

Gawrieh was arrested by Syrian authorities in Qamishli on 19 December 2013. His arrest was condemned by Assyrian organizations, human rights organizations, as well as other countries such as the United States.

Gawrieh was released by Syrian authorities on 22 June 2016. His release was applauded by the Syrian National Coalition and numerous Assyrian organisations.

On 12 April 2017, an official in the Movement for a Democratic Society (TEV-DEM) met with Gabriel Moushe Gawrieh and discussed the closure of two Assyrian Democratic Organization offices since March. It was the first time TEV-DEM officials met with the ADO.

References 

Syrian Assyrian politicians
Syrian people of Assyrian descent
Assyrian/Syriac Syrians
Assyrian nationalists
People of the Syrian civil war
1962 births
Living people